"Sleeping in Your Hand" is the debut single of Elisa, The song is from her debut album, Pipes & Flowers, released in 1997. The single was released in Europe only.

The Single

The single, which charted in the fifth position on the Italian charts paving the road to Elisa's success, was released in Italy in May, 1997 and in August in some European countries (in 1998 in Germany). In Europe the single was also published as a promotional EP.
An alternative version of the song was also published in the foreign singles and in the music video, the Mark Saunders Remix, which differs from the original in both arrangement and duration and was remixed by the English producer Mark Saunders. This version is also present on the album.
An acoustic version of the album, which was arranged and produced by Elisa, was recorded on the album Lotus, released in 2003. The arrangement differs greatly from the original and the remix and showcases Elisa's various talents as a singer, musician, songwriter, producer and arranger.
The remixed version of the song was featured on her first Greatest hits album Soundtrack '96-'06, which was released in 2006

The Video

The music video was directed by Paolo Caredda, who also directed the music video for Anche se non trovi le parole, and was produced by Katze Productions Ltd.

Track listing

CD Single Italy
 Sleeping in Your Hand (Original Version) - 4:22
 Sleeping in Your Hand (Instrumental) - 4:22

CD Promo Single UK & CD Single (Germany, Netherlands)
 Sleeping in Your Hand (Mark Saunders Remix) - 3:43
 Sleeping in Your Hand (Original Version) - 4:22
 Sleeping in Your Hand (Mark Saunders Long Version Remix) - 3:53

CD Single (Netherlands, Scandinavia)
 Sleeping in Your Hand (Mark Saunders Remix) - 3:43
 Sleeping in Your Hand (Original Version) - 4:22

CD EP Promo (Netherlands, Germany, Denmark)
 Tell Me - 5:06
 Mr. Want - 4:11
 Sleeping in Your Hand (Original Version) - 4:22
 The Marriage - 4:20

Charts

References

1997 singles
Elisa (Italian singer) songs
English-language Italian songs
1997 songs
Songs written by Elisa (Italian singer)
Sugar Music singles